A weak evolutionarily stable strategy (WESS) is a more broad form of evolutionarily stable strategy (ESS). Like ESS, a WESS is able to defend against an invading "mutant" strategy. This means the WESS cannot be entirely eliminated from the population.

The definition of WESS is similar to ESS. Any strategy s is a weakly evolutionarily stable strategy (WESS) if for any strategy s*≠s:

(i) u(s, s) > u(s*, s) or

(ii) u(s, s) = u(s*, s) and u(s, s*) ≥ u(s*, s*).

One example of WESS, in a prisoner's dilemma, is Tit-for-tat (a strategy that cooperates in the first interaction and then reciprocates the other player's action from the previous turn in all other iterations).

References

Evolutionary game theory